The Cyprus Joint Rescue Coordination Center or JRCC Larnaca is an independent agency of the Ministry of Defence of the Republic of Cyprus and its primary mission is to organize the national  Search and Rescue (SAR) system, to co-ordinate, to control and direct SAR operations in the region that the Cyprus JRCC is responsible for (which coincides with the Nicosia FIR),  so that people, whose lives are at risk as a result of aviation or maritime accidents, can be located and rescued in the least amount of time.

This is achieved by coordinating all the different agencies involved such as, Cyprus Police (Including Port and Marine Police, Cyprus Fire Service and Cyprus Police Aviation Unit), the Cypriot National Guard, the Cyprus Civil Defence and other secondary Units, acting as a communications agent between them, so that they do not conduct overlapping searches and waste time by searching areas already searched by other units and in general help all the different units operate as a single larger in numbers unit, eliminating any other problems that might occur.

It reports directly to the operational control of the Minister of Defence and it is staffed by qualified personnel of the Cyprus National Guard, mainly from the branches of the Navy and the Air Force. All logistic and technical support is the responsibility of the Ministry of Communications & Works.

Τhe Joint Rescue Coordination Center is located to in the city of Larnaca in a new owned building near of Larnaca Airport.

History
The Cyprus Joint Rescue Coordination Center was established by Law 5(III)/94 and started operating on a trial 24-hour basis on the 7th of August 1995 as an independent unit of the Cyprus Air Force Command.
On March 1, 2002 by decision of the Ministry Cabinet the JRCC undertook formally the responsibility for organizing, coordinating and monitoring, search and rescue operations, in the region that the Republic of Cyprus is responsible for.
The JRCC functioned as such until the 26th of July, 2010. Following the relevant opinion of Attorney General for the provisions of Law 5 (III) / 1994 (on Research - Rescue Ratification Act) JRCC reports directly to the Minister of Defence and operates as an independent agency of the Ministry of Defence.

Cyprus search and rescue region (SRR)
The Cyprus search and rescue region (SRR) coincides with the Nicosia FIR as described in the current Air Navigation Plan of the International Civil Aviation Organization (ICAO) as shown below:

Distress frequencies
The internationally established frequencies to be used for Distress and Safety and monitored by Search and Rescue are:
 518 kHz NAVTEX (Maritime safety information)
 121.5 MHz International civil aviation distress frequency
 243.0 MHz International military aviation distress frequency
 156.8 MHz (CH-16) International maritime call and distress frequency
 156.525 MHz (CH-70)
 2187.5 kHz
 4207.5 kHz
 6312.0 kHz
 8414.5 kHz
 12577.0 kHz
 16804.5 kHz
 2182 kHz International maritime call and distress frequency on MF
 406.025 MHz Transmission frequency of EPIRB, ELT and PLB of the COSPAS-SARSAT satellite  system

JRCC Larnaca maintains continued monitoring of the following frequencies:
 121.5 MHz VHF/AM
 134.0 MHz VHF/AM (Common of Initial Contact with JRCC)
 243.0 MHz UHF/AM
 255.0 MHz UHF/AM (Common of Initial Contact with JRCC)
 156.8 MHz (CH-16) VHF/FM
 2182 kHz MF/HF
The DSC frequencies mentioned above are monitored by Cyprus Coast Station (Cyprus Radio)
 518 kHz NAVTEX

Note that: JRCC uses the NATO phonetic alphabet for communicating characters in English and the standard Greek phonetic alphabet for communicating characters in Greek.

See also
Cypriot National Guard
Cyprus Air Forces
Cyprus Civil Defence
Cyprus Fire Service
Cyprus Navy
Cyprus Police
Cyprus Police Aviation Unit
Cyprus Port & Marine Police

References

External links
http://www.jrcc-cyprus.mod.gov.cy
http://www.mod.gov.cy

Rescue agencies
Government agencies established in 1995
Rescue coordination centres
JRCC